The Tampa Bay Jewish Film Festival is an annual event that takes place in Tampa, Florida. In 2006 the festival commenced with a gala which was held on February 8 at the St. Pete Times Forum in order to celebrate the festival's 10th anniversary.

References

Film festivals in Florida
Festivals in Tampa, Florida
Jewish film festivals in the United States
Jews and Judaism in Florida
Cinema of Florida
1996 establishments in Florida
Film festivals established in 1996